Magellanic spiral galaxies are (usually) dwarf galaxies which are classified as the type Sm (and SAm, SBm, SABm). They are galaxies with one single spiral arm, and are named after their prototype, the Large Magellanic Cloud, an SBm galaxy. They can be considered to be intermediate between dwarf spiral galaxies and irregular galaxies.

Magellanic spirals
SAm galaxies are a type of unbarred spiral galaxy, while SBm are a type of barred spiral galaxy. SABm are a type of intermediate spiral galaxy.

Type Sm and Im galaxies have also been categorized as irregular galaxies with some structure (type Irr-1). Sm galaxies are typically disrupted and asymmetric. dSm galaxies are dwarf spiral galaxies or dwarf irregular galaxies, depending on categorization scheme.

The Magellanic spiral classification was introduced by Gerard de Vaucouleurs, along with Magellanic irregular (Im), when he revamped the Hubble classification of galaxies.

Grades of Magellanic Spiral Galaxies

List of Magellanic spirals

Barred (SBm)
 Large Magellanic Cloud (LMC [prototype])
 Small Magellanic Cloud (SMC)
 NGC 1311
 NGC 4618
 NGC 4236
 NGC 55
 NGC 4214
 NGC 3109
 IC 4710

Intermediate (SABm)
 NGC 4625
 NGC 5713

Unbarred (SAm)
 NGC 5204
 NGC 2552

See also 
 Galaxy morphological classification

References 

Galaxy morphological types